Valley Regional Council may refer to:

 Bet Shean Valley Regional Council, a regional council in northern Israel that encompasses most of the settlements in the Bet Shean Valley
 Jezreel Valley Regional Council, a regional council in northern Israel that encompasses most of the settlements in the Jezreel Valley

See also

 Jordan Valley Regional Council